David James Lindsay (born 17 May 1966) is an English former professional footballer who played in the Football League for Crystal Palace as a left back.

He began his youth career at Crystal Palace and signed professional terms in May 1984. His league debut, however, was in December 1983, in a home 1–2 defeat to Carlisle United, but it was his only appearance that season. In season 1984–85 he made 11 appearances and in 1985–86 began the season as first choice left back but played only nine times. In the 1986 close season, Lindsay moved on to play for Finnish club Kuopion Elo, before signing for Welling United in March 1987, where he made 63 appearances over the next two seasons.

References

1966 births
Living people
English footballers
Association football defenders
Crystal Palace F.C. players
Welling United F.C. players
English Football League players
National League (English football) players
Footballers from the London Borough of Havering